The National Art Gallery of The Bahamas is an art gallery in Nassau, The Bahamas. In September 2011 the gallery announced Amanda Coulson, as the new Director and 4 new staff appointments. John Cox joined the gallery in January 2012 as Chief Curator.

The National Art Gallery of The Bahamas (NAGB) was the first institution of its kind in the history of The Bahamas, announced in 1996, by then-Prime Minister, Hubert A. Ingraham, as part of a larger expanded system of museums that would record, preserve and historicize the narrative of the independent sovereign nation, established in 1973.

The NAGB is housed in the historic Villa Doyle (see below) situated on West and West Hill Streets, in Historic Charles Towne and on the border of Delancy Town, and is within easy walking distance of Downtown Nassau's port and main business quarter. It physically bridges the two districts that are at the core of the nation: bustling Downtown—the hub of colonial power and continued wealth through commerce and tourism—and the ‘Over-the-Hill’ community—also known as the ‘nation’s navel’—where the Majority Rule leaders were born and raised. Sadly, once a thriving middle class community, the latter is now considerably diminished.

The museum boasts four gallery spaces—the PE, or permanent exhibition space, on the ground floor, which houses rotating shows drawn on the National Collection; The PS Room, a project space for monthly interventions, also on the ground floor; and two temporary exhibition spaces on the second floor (T1 and T2).

The NAGB is partially funded by a governmental subvention but engages a public-private network to operate and is also supported by the community that it serves, in the form of ticket sales, memberships, donations and otherwise.

The museum is housed in the Villa Doyle, a mansion built in the 1860s as the home to first Chief Justice in The Bahamas. After the addition of a new wing in the 1920s, it became one of Nassau's prized stately homes. Positioned on the rise overlooking the top of West Street, Villa Doyle is typical of great houses of earlier centuries with surrounding verandahs.

Left to wrack and ruin in the modern age, many argued for its demolition to obliterate the reminder of our colonial past. Under a campaign led by historian and founding chairman, Dr. Gail Saunders, the building was saved as a site where history could be recognized, unpacked and interpreted. The building was subsequently restored in the 1990s to become the NAGB.

Villa Doyle's restoration took almost seven years to complete involving a team of professionals and consultants under the supervision of architect, Anthony Jervis; Civil Engineer, George Cox; and the National Art Gallery's Committee chaired by Dr. Gail Saunders.

See also
 List of national galleries

References

External links 
 Gallery website

Art museums established in 2003
Art museums and galleries in the Bahamas
Bahamas
2003 establishments in the Bahamas